

The Hundred of Makin is a cadastral unit  of hundred located in the Australian state of South Australia within the County of Buckingham and the state government region of the Limestone Coast about  south-east of the state capital of Adelaide and about  north-west and  south-east respectively of the municipal seats of Bordertown and  Tailem Bend.

Its extent includes part of the locality of Ngarkat in its northern half while its southern half  is occupied by the entirety of the locality of Makin along with portions of Coombe and MacCallum in the west and in the east respectively.

References

Makin
Limestone Coast